The Union Depot and Atlantic Coast Line Freight Station (also known as the Railroad Passenger Depot and Freight Station) is a historic site in Live Oak, Florida, United States. It is located at 208 North Ohio Avenue, on the corner of Haines Street Northeast. The station was built at one of two junctions of an Atlantic Coast Line Railroad and Seaboard Air Line Railroad lines. 

The station was a flag stop on the SCL and Louisville and Nashville's Gulf Wind, between Madison and Live Oak, and until 1966 and additional daily local train served the station as well. The ACL and the SAL merged in 1967 to form the Seaboard Coast Line Railroad. In 1971 the SCL terminated the Gulf Wind, on the creation of Amtrak, ending passenger service in Live Oak. 

On April 24, 1986, it was added to the U.S. National Register of Historic Places. When Amtrak extended the Sunset Limited to Orlando in 1993 the nearest station with a stop was in Lake City. Today, only the former SAL line survives.

The Suwannee County Historical Museum is located in the depot. Exhibits include a telephone display, a 16th-century Timucaun Indian Village recreation and local history artifacts. The station is one block south of the Old Live Oak City Hall.

Gallery

References

External links

 Suwannee County listings, Florida's Office of Cultural and Historical Programs
 Information about the Suwannee County Historical Museum on the City of Live oak website
 Information about the Suwannee County Historical Museum on the Suwanne County Tourism site

Railway stations on the National Register of Historic Places in Florida
Live Oak, Florida
Museums in Suwannee County, Florida
Buildings and structures in Suwannee County, Florida
Live Oak
History museums in Florida
Seaboard Air Line Railroad stations
Vernacular architecture in Florida
National Register of Historic Places in Suwannee County, Florida
Railway buildings and structures on the National Register of Historic Places in Florida
Railway freight houses on the National Register of Historic Places
Transportation buildings and structures in Suwannee County, Florida